Sir Stephen John Bull, 2nd Baronet (11 October 19049 March 1942) was an English lawyer and baronet.

Early life
Bull was the son of the Right Hon. Sir William Bull, 1st Baronet MP, of Chelsea, London, a Conservative politician, as well as the brother of Anthony Bull.

He was educated at Gresham's School, Holt and New College, Oxford. He succeeded to his father's title in 1931.

Career

Bull was admitted a solicitor in 1928, and in 1934 had offices at 3, Stone Buildings, Lincoln's Inn.

He was honorary solicitor to the Royal Life Saving Society, the Royal Society of St George, and the League of Mercy, Liveryman of the Worshipful Company of Mercers of the City of London, Governor of the Upper Latymer Foundation School, Vice-Chairman of South Hammersmith Conservative Association and a member of the Board of Management of the West London Hospital.

War Service
During the Second World War, Bull served with the Royal Air Force in the Far East. He was commissioned as a Pilot officer on 11 October 1940 and was killed at the Fall of Java in March 1942, during the Japanese offensives in the Dutch East Indies.

Arms

References

Burke's Peerage, Baronetage & Knightage ed. Charles Mosley (107th edition, 3 volumes, Burke's Peerage Ltd, 2003), volume 1, page 581
Bull, Sir Stephen John in Who Was Who 1897-2006, Retrieved 16 August 2007

External links
The Fall of Java Island, March 1942

1904 births
1942 deaths
Alumni of New College, Oxford
Baronets in the Baronetage of the United Kingdom
Royal Air Force personnel killed in World War II
Royal Air Force officers
People educated at Gresham's School
Royal Air Force Volunteer Reserve personnel of World War II
English solicitors
20th-century English lawyers